Martin Sherlock  was an Anglican priest in Ireland during the late Eighteenth century.

Sherlock was  educated at Trinity College, Dublin. He was Chaplain to the Earl of Bristol; Vicar of Castleconnor and Kilglass; and Archdeacon of Killala  from 1789 until his death in 1799.

Notes

Alumni of Trinity College Dublin
18th-century Irish Anglican priests
1799 deaths
Archdeacons of Killala